Maarten van Dis (born 24 April 1936) is a Dutch rower. He competed in the men's coxed pair event at the 1960 Summer Olympics.

References

1936 births
Living people
Dutch male rowers
Olympic rowers of the Netherlands
Rowers at the 1960 Summer Olympics
Sportspeople from Haarlem